Phobia Phoney is the debut album released by Bunkface, a Malaysian Punk Rock band, in 2010. It was made by their own production named Bunkface Production.The album was released in March 2010 in Malaysia. Phobia Phoney is made up of 6 English songs and 4 Malay songs. It is including their hit singles such as "Situasi", "Revolusi", "Prom Queen","Ekstravaganza,"Escape Dance", "Soldier" and Dunia.

"The album is about the fear (phobia) of getting to that step, to get to that level where we are now. We were really scared, so that journey taught us how to handle situations, discrimination and we revolutionized ourselves from time to time.
The discrimination bit came up when we started the band, when we tried to bring our sound to the music industry, to build up Bunkface, and people were rejecting and saying this and that, so to us it was like “Fine, we don’t care what you want to say, we’re going to try,” and here we are now.
We realized at one point that we were ready to go and ready to step to that level, therefore the album title is called Phobia Phoney – it's about our journey," The band stated in an interview with MTV.

Track listing

Personnel
 Sam - Vocals, guitar
 Paan - Guitar, backing vocals
 Youk - Bass, backing vocals
 Ejam - Drums
 Gjie - Synths and keyboards

External links
 http://www.spirit-of-rock.com/album-groupe-Bunkface-nom_album-Phobia_Phoney-l-en.html
 http://www.bharian.com.my/bharian/articles/SimbolikperjuanganBunkface/Article (Malay)
 http://accordingtohafizanmohd.blogspot.com/2010/07/bunkface-phobia-phoney.html
http://blog.mtvasia.com/2010/08/03/bunkface-interview/

2010 debut albums
Bunkface albums
Malay-language albums